Matthew Leuenberger (born 7 June 1988) is a former professional Australian rules footballer who played for the Brisbane Lions and the Essendon Football Club in the Australian Football League (AFL).

Leuenberger represented Western Australia in the 2006 AFL Under 18 Championships and was rewarded with All-Australian selection as the ruckman.

Leuenberger was drafted to the Brisbane Lions with their first selection and fourth overall in the 2006 national draft. He made his debut against the West Coast Eagles in round 14, 2007 at Subiaco Oval. His first two seasons saw him play 19 matches, and the first three of 2009 before sustaining a knee injury. He missed the remainder of the season after his knee became infected following surgery, and consequently lost 11 kilograms.

Leuenberger played every match for 2010 and 22 in 2011, and amassed 724 hitouts during 2011, the second most in the league after finals. During the 2012 pre-season, he suffered from tendonitis in his achilles, but was declared fit for the round one match against , however, he re-injured his achilles in round three against ,  which saw him miss the remainder of the season.

Leuenberger missed the start of the 2013 season returning from injury, but was recalled to the senior side in round 2. Despite persistent injuries, speculation arose that he would be a trade target as one of the "AFL's most wanted players," however, he re-signed with Brisbane in June, eliminating a potential trade at the end of the season. He was named best-on-ground in the sixth QClash against  and was awarded the Marcus Ashcroft Medal, after 20 disposals, 7 tackles, and 29-hitouts.

Leuenberger played the first four games of the 2014 season before succumbing to another long-term injury, where he tore his meniscus and would miss at least three months. After missing more than four months, he returned for the final round clash against  at Simonds Stadium.

The 2015 season saw Leuenberger as the backup ruckman to Stefan Martin and he was predicted to leave Brisbane to a team where he would be the number one ruckman. At seasons end, he decided to leave Brisbane through free agency and nominated  as his club of choice. He officially joined Essendon on 15 October.

After playing 29 games for Essendon and 108 for the Brisbane Lions Leuenberger announced his immediate AFL retirement despite being offered a new contract for 2019.

References

External links

1988 births
Living people
Brisbane Lions players
Essendon Football Club players
East Perth Football Club players
People educated at Hale School
Australian rules footballers from Western Australia
Australian people of Swiss descent